{{DISPLAYTITLE:5-HT3 antagonist}}

The 5-HT3 antagonists, informally known as "setrons", are a class of drugs that act as receptor antagonists at the 5-HT3 receptor, a subtype of serotonin receptor found in terminals of the vagus nerve and in certain areas of the brain.
With the notable exceptions of alosetron and cilansetron, which are used in the treatment of irritable bowel syndrome, all 5-HT3 antagonists are antiemetics, used in the prevention and treatment of nausea and vomiting. They are particularly effective in controlling the nausea and vomiting produced by cancer chemotherapy and are considered the gold standard for this purpose.

The 5-HT3 antagonists may be identified by the suffix -setron, and are classified under code A04AA of the 's Anatomical Therapeutic Chemical Classification System.

Medical uses
5-HT3 antagonists are most effective in the prevention and treatment of chemotherapy-induced nausea and vomiting (CINV), especially that caused by highly emetogenic drugs such as cisplatin; when used for this purpose, they may be given alone or, more frequently, with a glucocorticoid, usually dexamethasone. They are usually given intravenously, shortly before administration of the chemotherapeutic agent, although some authors have argued that oral administration may be preferred.
The concomitant administration of a NK1 receptor antagonist, such as aprepitant, significantly increases the efficacy of 5-HT3 antagonists in preventing both acute and delayed CINV.

The 5-HT3 antagonists are also indicated in the prevention and treatment of radiation-induced nausea and vomiting (RINV), when needed, and postoperative nausea and vomiting (PONV). Although they are more effective at controlling CINV—where they stop symptoms altogether in up to 70% of people, and reduce them in the remaining 30%—, they are just as effective as other agents for PONV.

Current evidence suggests that 5-HT3 antagonists are ineffective in controlling motion sickness. A randomized, placebo-controlled trial of ondansetron to treat motion sickness in air ambulance personnel showed subjective improvement, but it was not statistically significant.

Available agents
Ondansetron was the first 5-HT3 antagonist, developed by Glaxo around 1984. Its efficacy was first established in 1987, in animal models, and it was extensively studied over the following years. Ondansetron was approved by the U.S. Food and Drug Administration in 1991, and has since become available in several other countries, including the UK, Ireland, Australia, Canada, France and Brazil. As of 2008, ondansetron and granisetron are the only 5-HT3 antagonists available as a generic drug in the United States. Ondansetron may be given several times daily, depending on the severity of symptoms.
Tropisetron was also first described in 1984. It is available in several countries, such as the UK, Australia and France, but not in the United States. The effects of tropisetron last up to 24 hours, so it only requires once-daily administration.
Granisetron was developed around 1988. It is available in the U.S., UK, Australia and other countries. Clinical trials suggest that it is more effective than other 5-HT3 antagonists in preventing delayed CINV (nausea and vomiting that occur more than 24 hours after the first dose of chemotherapy). It is taken once daily.
Dolasetron was first mentioned in the literature in 1989. It is a prodrug, and most of its effects are due to its active metabolite, hydrodolasetron, which is formed in the liver by the enzyme carbonyl reductase. Dolasetron was approved by the FDA in 1997, and is also administered once daily.
Palonosetron is the newest 5-HT3 antagonist to become available in the U.S. market. It is an isoquinoline derivative, and is effective in preventing delayed CINV. Palonosetron was approved by the FDA in 2003, initially for intravenous use. An oral formulation was approved on August 22, 2008, for prevention of acute CINV alone, as a large clinical trial did not show oral administration to be as effective as IV use against delayed CINV.
Ramosetron is only available in Japan and certain Southeast Asian countries as of 2008. It has higher affinity for the 5-HT3 receptor than the older 5-HT3 antagonists, and maintains its effects over two days; it is therefore significantly more effective for delayed CINV. In animal studies, ramosetron was also effective against irritable bowel syndrome-like symptoms.

Alosetron and cilansetron—the latter was developed by Solvay but never approved by the FDA —are not antiemetics; instead, they are indicated in the treatment of a subset of irritable bowel syndrome where diarrhea is the dominant symptom. Alosetron was withdrawn from the U.S. market in 2000 due to unacceptably frequent severe side effects, including ischemic colitis, and is only available through a restrictive program to patients who meet certain requirements.

Certain prokinetic drugs such as cisapride, renzapride and metoclopramide, although not 5-HT3 antagonists proper, possess some weak antagonist effect at the 5-HT3 receptor. Galanolactone, a diterpenoid found in ginger, is a 5-HT3 antagonist and is believed to at least partially mediate the anti-emetic activity of this plant. Mirtazapine is a tetracyclic antidepressant with 5-HT2 and 5-HT3 antagonist effects that also possesses strong anti-emetic properties, however it is also very sedating.  Studies show that Mirtazapine is as equally effective in treating chemotherapy-related nausea and vomiting as standard treatments; it is also cheaper and has fewer side effects than typical anti-emetics, and its antidepressant qualities may be an added benefit for cancer populations.  Mirtazapine has also been used in the treatment of the motility disorder gastroparesis due to its anti-emetic effects. Olanzapine, an atypical antipsychotic with anti-emetic properties similar to those of Mirtazapine, also shows promise in treating chemotherapy-induced nausea and vomiting.

Adverse effects
There are few side effects related to the use of 5-HT3 antagonists; the most common are constipation or diarrhea, headache, and dizziness. Unlike antihistamines with antiemetic properties such as cyclizine, 5-HT3 antagonists do not produce sedation, nor do they cause extrapyramidal effects, as phenothiazines (such as prochlorperazine) sometimes do.

All 5-HT3 antagonists have been associated with asymptomatic electrocardiogram changes, such as prolongation of the PT and QTc intervals and certain arrhythmias. The clinical significance of these side effects is unknown.

Pharmacology

Mechanism of action
The 5-HT3 receptors are present in several critical sites involved in emesis, including vagal afferents, the solitary tract nucleus (STN), and the area postrema itself. Serotonin is released by the enterochromaffin cells of the small intestine in response to chemotherapeutic agents and may stimulate vagal afferents (via 5-HT3 receptors) to initiate the vomiting reflex. The 5-HT3 receptor antagonists suppress vomiting and nausea by inhibiting serotonin binding to the 5-HT3 receptors. The highest concentration of 5-HT3 receptors in the central nervous system (CNS) are found in the STN and chemoreceptor trigger zone (CTZ), and 5-HT3 antagonists may also suppress vomiting and nausea by acting at these sites. The 5-HT3 antagonists are greatly selective and have little affinity for other receptors, such as dopamine, histamine and muscarinic acetylcholine receptors.

Pharmacokinetics
All 5-HT3 antagonists are well-absorbed and effective after oral administration, and all are metabolized in the liver by various isoenzymes of the cytochrome P450 system. They do not, however, inhibit or induce these enzymes.

Comparative pharmacology 
Despite that the 5-HT3 receptor antagonists share their mechanism of action, they have different chemical structures and exhibit differences in affinity for the receptor, dose response and duration of effect. They are also metabolized in different ways, that is, different components of the cytochrome P450 (CYP) system predominate in the metabolism of the antagonists.

Because of this, patients who are resistant to one antagonist might benefit from another. A correlation exists between the number of active CYP 2D6 alleles and the number of vomiting episodes by patients who receive treatment with cisplatin and ondansetron or tropisetron. Patients with multiple alleles tend to be unresponsive to the antiemetic drug and vice versa.

History
The history of the 5-HT3 receptor antagonists began in 1957, when John Gaddum and Zuleika P. Picarelli at the University of Edinburgh proposed the existence of two serotonin receptor subtypes, the M and D receptors (thus named because their function could be blocked by morphine and dibenzyline respectively). The 5-HT3 receptor was later found to correspond to the M receptor. In the 1970s, John Fozard found that metoclopramide and cocaine were weak antagonists at the 5-HT3 (5-HT-M) receptor. Fozard and Maurice Gittos later synthesized MDL 72222, the first potent and truly selective 5-HT3 receptor antagonist. The antiemetic effects of metoclopramide were found to be partially because of its serotonin antagonism.

While Fozard was investigating cocaine analogues, researchers at Sandoz identified the potent, selective 5-HT3 receptor antagonist ICS 205-930 from which the first marketed selective 5-HT3 receptor antagonists ondansetron and granisetron were developed, and approved in 1991 and 1993 respectively.  Several compounds related to MDL 72222 were synthesized which eventually resulted in approval of tropisetron in 1994 and dolasetron in 1997. A new and improved 5-HT3 receptor antagonist, named palonosetron, was approved in 2003.
The development of selective 5-HT3 receptor antagonists was a dramatic improvement in the treatment of nausea and vomiting.  Ondansetron, granisetron, dolasetron and palonosetron are currently approved in the United States, and form the cornerstone of therapy for the control of acute emesis with chemotherapy agents with moderate to high emetogenic potential.

Development
5-HT3 receptor antagonists or serotonin antagonists were first introduced in the early 1990s, and they have become the most widely used antiemetic drugs in chemotherapy. They have also been proven safe and effective for treatment  of postoperative nausea and vomiting. Serotonin (5-HT) is found widely distributed throughout the gut and the central nervous system. In the gut, 5-HT is found mostly in mucosal enterochromaffin cells. Enterochromaffin cells are sensory transducers that release 5-HT to activate intrinsic (via 5-HT1P and 5-HT4 receptors) and extrinsic (via 5-HT3 receptors) primary afferent nerves. Chemotherapeutic drugs for malignant disorders that cause vomiting have been found to cause release of large amounts of serotonin from enterochromaffin cells in the gut, serotonin acts on 5-HT3 receptors in the gut and brain stem.

Drug design
Experiments have shown evidence that the ligand-binding site is located at the interface of two adjacent subunits. The ligand binding site is formed by three loops (A-C) from the principal ligand binding subunit (principal face) and three β-strands (D-F) from the adjacent subunit (complementary face). The amino acid residue E129 on loop A faces into the binding pocket and forms a critical hydrogen bond with the hydroxyl group of 5-HT.  Loop B contains W183, a critical tryptophan ligand binding residue that contributes to a cation-π interaction between the pi electron density of tryptophan and the primary amine of 5-HT.  Loop C residues have been considered as candidates for the differing pharmacology of rodent and human 5-HT3 receptors because of their divergence between species.  The most important aromatic residue within loop C is probably Y234 that lies opposite to the loop B tryptophan in the ligand binding pocket and is involved in ligand binding.   Loops D and F are in fact β-strands not loops.   W90 in loop D is critical for ligand binding and antagonists may directly contact R92. The azabicyclic ring of the competitive antagonist granisetron is located close to W183 forming a cation-pi interaction.   Loop E residues Y143, G148, E149, V150, Q151, N152, Y153 and K154 may be important for granisetron binding.   The structure of loop F has yet to be clarified but W195 and D204 seem to be critical for ligand binding.

Backbone 

Chemical structures of the first generation 5-HT3 receptor antagonist can be categorized to three main classes
Carbazole derivatives (ondansetron)
Indazoles (Granisetron)
Indoles (Tropisetron and Dolasetron)

The first-generation 5-HT3 receptor antagonist (ondansetron, dolasetron, granisetron, and tropisetron) have been the most important drugs in antiemetic therapy for emetogenic chemotherapy. They are especially effective in treating acute emesis, occurring in the first 24 hours following chemotherapy.
A newer drug palonosetron is a pharmacologically distinct and highly selective, second generation 5-HT3 receptor antagonist. Palonosetron has two stereogenic centers and exists as four stereoisomers.
Palonosetron has longer half-life (40h) and greater receptor binding affinity (>30 fold; when compared to first generation antagonists).

Pharmacophore 

The pharmacophore of 5-HT3receptors consists of three components: a carbonyl-containing linking moiety,  aromatic/heteroaromatic ring, and a basic center.  The carbonyl group is coplanar to the aromatic ring. 5-HT3 receptor antagonists are more likely to bind in their protonated form. Docking of a range of antagonists into a homology model of the 5-HT3 receptor binding site shows a reasonably good agreement with the pharmacophore model and supports the observed differences between species. Studies of granisetron in the binding pocket revealed that the aromatic rings of granisetron lie between W183 and Y234 and the azabicyclic ring between W90 and F226. In this study another energetically favorable location of granisetron was identified, closer to the membrane, on a position that could be a part of a binding/unbinding pathway for the ligand. A similarly located alternative binding site for granisetron has since been identified in another study of the 5-HT3 receptor.

Structure-activity relationship 

5-HT3 receptor antagonists share the same pharmacophore. An aromatic moiety (preferably indole), a linking acyl group capable of hydrogen bonding interactions, and a basic amine (nitrogen) can be regarded as the key pharmacophoric elements of the known 5-HT3receptor antagonists. There are steric limitations of the aromatic binding site and although two hydrogen-bonding interactions are possible on the heterocyclic linking group (oxadiazole capable of accepting two hydrogen bonds), only one is essential for high affinity.  An optimal environment of the basic nitrogen is when its constrained within an azabicyclic system with the highest affinity observed for systems with nitrogen at the bridgehead position and secondary amines being more potent. The 5-HT3 receptor can only accommodate small substituents on the charged amine, a methyl group being optimal. The optimal distance between the aromatic binding site and the basic amine is 8,4-8,9 Å and it is best if a two-carbon linkage separates the oxadiazole and the nitrogen.  An increasing substitution of R increases affinity. The most potent antagonists of 5-HT3 receptors have a 6-membered aromatic ring, and they usually have 6,5 heterocyclic rings. No correlation has been found between the lipophilicity of compounds and the 5-HT3 receptor affinities.  Since most of the known 5-HT3 antagonists are ester or amide derivatives they are potentially susceptible to hydrolysis, which could be avoided by incorporating H-bond acceptors within a 5-membered heteroaromatic ring.

Structure-activity relationship (SAR) studies of LGIC receptor ligands are valuable to investigate their structure and function.  An antagonist-like molecule with low intrinsic activity (ia) decreases the frequency of channel-opening and the permeability of ions. Small lipophilic C5 (R1) (see fig. 5) substituents afford compounds with potent antagonism which indicates that the C5 substituent may fit in a narrow, hydrophobic groove of the binding region in the receptor.  It seems that the amino acid residues that interact with the C7 (R2) substituents have little to do with ligand binding but play a big role in ion channel gating.  Sterically bulky substituents show a greater interaction with the gating amino acid residues and favor the open conformation af the ion channel because of sterical repulsion.

Ondansetron is a racemate but the stereochemistry of the asymmetric carbon atom is not an important factor in the 5-HT3 receptor interaction.  Annelation of the 1,7-positions of the indole nucleus of ondansetron results in increased affinity for the receptor.

A methyl- group appears to be as effective functionally as a chlorine in the R position (see fig. 6).  The carbonyl group is responsible for a strong interaction with the receptor and contributes significantly to the binding process.  This carbonyl group is completely coplanar with the adjacent aromatic ring, indicating that the receptor-bound conformation corresponds to one of the most stable conformations of this group in the flexible compounds.

Research
A small, open-label trial carried out in 2000 found ondansetron to be useful in treating antipsychotic-induced tardive dyskinesia in people with schizophrenia. 
The study's patients also showed significant improvement in the disease's symptoms; a later double-blind, randomized controlled trial also found ondansetron to significantly improve schizophrenia symptoms when used as an adjunct to haloperidol, and people taking both drugs experienced fewer of the adverse effects commonly associated with haloperidol.

See also
Serotonin transporter

References

Drug discovery
5-HT3 antagonists
Antiemetics